Mark Philip Schaeffer (June 5, 1948 – June 1, 2022) was an American professional baseball player. He batted and threw left-handed.

Schaeffer was born in Santa Monica, California, and attended Grover Cleveland High School in Reseda, California. He was drafted by the Boston Red Sox in the second round of the 1966 Major League Baseball draft. He was traded along with Derrel Thomas and Bill Greif from the Astros to the Padres for Dave Roberts on December 3, 1971. Schaeffer made his major league debut on April 18, 1972, at the age of 23 with the San Diego Padres.

Schaeffer was strictly a relief pitcher in MLB (41 appearances, zero starts). On July 29, 1972, during a 17 inning, 4–3 victory over the Reds, Schaffer picked up his lone MLB save by retiring the final batter of the game.

Schaeffer died June 1, 2022.

References

External links

Pelota Binaria (Venezuelan Winter League)

1948 births
2022 deaths
Baseball players from Santa Monica, California
Cardenales de Lara players
American expatriate baseball players in Venezuela
Florida Instructional League Astros players
Florida Instructional League Red Sox players
Louisville Colonels (minor league) players
Major League Baseball pitchers
Oklahoma City 89ers players
Pittsfield Red Sox players
San Diego Padres players
Savannah Senators players
Waterloo Hawks (baseball) players
Winston-Salem Red Sox players
Burials at Oakwood Memorial Park Cemetery